Justin Merriman is a freelance photojournalist who has traveled the world extensively, covering events in India, Cuba, Italy, Ukraine, Afghanistan and Pakistan. His work has appeared in national and international publications, including The New York Times, The Washington Post, The Wall Street Journal, the Atlantic, Time, USA Today, Sports Illustrated, Vanity Fair, Forbes, and The Guardian.

Based in Pittsburgh, Pennsylvania, Merriman also is a founding member of American Reportage, a collective of documentary photojournalists specializing in comprehensive storytelling of the American experience.

In addition to being a journalist, Merriman also is an accomplished filmmaker. He recently made his debut, directing and producing SOMETHING LIKE HOME, a documentary short for the language app, Duolingo. The project took Merriman to Turkey and Jordan to interview and film displaced and refugee Syrians on how they use language to transform their lives.

His journalistic work has been recognized by several prestigious organizations, winning awards from Pictures of the Year International, Society of Professional Journalists, the National Press Photographers Association, National Headliners Awards, the Society for News Design, the Atlanta Photojournalism Seminar, the Northern Short Course, the Southern Short Course, the American Society of Tropical Medicine and Hygiene, the Military Reporters and Editors Association, and the Western Pennsylvania Press Club. He was named Photographer of the Year by the News Photographer Association of Greater Pittsburgh four times, and was honored in 2016 with the Keystone Press Awards Distinguished Visual Award  from the Pennsylvania Newspaper Association.

After working in the United States and overseas as a photojournalist for newspapers, Merriman decided to tell the stories of communities throughout Pennsylvania, Ohio and West Virginia.

Merriman chronicled the U.S. War on Terror after covering the United 93 crash in Shanksville, Pennsylvania, on Sept. 11, 2001. His journey took him across the United States, as well as to the battlefields in  Afghanistan, Iraq and Pakistan.

He also traveled to Cuba in 2002 to report on life on the island nation under Fidel Castro, visited India to tell of the efforts to eradicate polio on the subcontinent, was in Haiti in the aftermath of the devastating 2010 earthquake, returned to Cuba in 2012 to photograph Pope Benedict XVI's visit, and was at The Vatican for the 2013 papal conclave and subsequent election of Pope Francis.

Merriman covered the second anniversary of Egypt's revolution and the unrest that followed, Russia's 2014 invasion of Crimea and the subsequent international political crisis, and visited the U.S. military prison at Guantanamo Bay, Cuba, in 2015.

Most recently, Merriman traveled the entire stretch of the U.S. border with Mexico documenting issues of immigration.

Born in Greensburg, Pennsylvania, Merriman graduated from the University of Pittsburgh at Greensburg in 2000 with a B.A. in English Writing. In 2009, the university conferred on him its prestigious Alumnus of Distinction award.

References

External links

Tribune-Review employees recognized at national Clarion Awards – Trib Total Media
AtL 64 – A Darn Good Discussion – Around the Lens
Justin Merriman: Biography – IMDb
Justin Merriman: Variety
Duolingo film looks at language and lives of Refugees - Tribune Review
Reporting on 'American Coyotes' Along the U.S.-Mexican Border - WESA
This photographer gave his life to show you what war's really like - New York Post
83rd National Headliner Awards Winners 
Duolingo premiers first documentary - Pittsburgh Business Times
Emotions Raw As Pittsburgh Grapples With A Week Of Turbulent News - WESA

Year of birth missing (living people)
Living people
American photojournalists
People from Westmoreland County, Pennsylvania
University of Pittsburgh alumni
Journalists from Pennsylvania